Ciacci is a surname of Italian origin. Notable people with the surname include:

 Antonio Ciacci, best known as Little Tony (1941–2013), Sammarinese pop singer and actor
 Catullo Ciacci (1934–1996), Italian racing cyclist
 Matteo Ciacci (born 1990), Sammarinese politician
 Nicola Ciacci (born 1982), Sammarinese footballer
 Sante Ciacci (1941), former Sammarinese cyclist

Italian-language surnames